Rex Collymore (born 10 June 1939) is a Guyanese cricketer. He played in 1 List A and 41 first-class matches for Guyana from 1963 to 1976.

See also
 List of Guyanese representative cricketers

References

External links
 

1939 births
Living people
Guyanese cricketers
Guyana cricketers